Crossbow was the code name in World War II for Anglo-American operations against the German long range reprisal weapons (V-weapons) programme. 
The main V-weapons were the V-1 flying bomb and V-2 rocket – these were launched against Britain from 1944 to 1945 and used against continental European targets as well. 

Initial intelligence investigations in 1943 into the progress of German long range weapons were carried out under the code name Bodyline. On 15 November, a larger operation was set up under the name  Crossbow. Post-war, Crossbow operations became known as "Operation Crossbow" particularly following the  1965 film of the same name.

Crossbow included strategic operations against research and development of the weapons, their manufacture, transportation and attacks on their launch site, and fighter intercepts against missiles in flight.
At one point, the British government, in near panic, demanded that upwards of 40% of bomber sorties be targeted against the launch sites.

The Crossbow attacks were not very successful, and every raid against a V-1 or V-2 launch site was one fewer raid against other targets in the Third Reich. The diversion of Allied resources from other targets represented a major success for Hitler.

Tactical bombing 

In May 1943 Allied surveillance observed the construction of the first of eleven large sites in northern France for secret German weapons, including six for the V-2 rocket. In November it discovered the first of 96 "ski sites" for the V-1 flying bomb.

Officials debated the extent of the German weapons' danger; some viewed the sites as decoys to divert Allied bombers, while others feared chemical or biological warheads. The Allies received detailed information about V-1, V-2 and Peenemünde from the Austrian resistance group (CASSIA) around the later executed priest Heinrich Maier. This also included the production sites such as the Raxwerke.  When reconnaissance and intelligence information regarding the V-2 became convincing, the War Cabinet Defence Committee (Operations) directed the campaign's first planned raid (the Operation Hydra attack on Peenemünde in August 1943).

The works in France were the German "Site System 1" which was to be 96 fixed launching sites with storage bunkers (the 'ski' shapes) and outdoor ramps. Site System 2 (a reserve) and System 3 were planned. There were also four larger Wasserwerk ("Waterworks") bunker sites: Siracourt, Lottinghen, Nardouet, and Brécourt. Intended for use in January 1944 actual progress in construction, training and supply of V-1s was behind when inspected by German high command in October. French reports and detailed aerial reconnaissance linked with reconnaissance of Peenemünde indicated possibility of 2,000 missiles per day against England. Over half the sites were completed by December but Allied intelligence had identified all 96 by end of January. The first bombing of sites was by USAAF Martin B-26 Marauder medium bombers in early December with RAF Bomber Command starting night-time attacks shortly after but the greater inaccuracy of night bombing against small targets led Joint Chiefs of Staff to use US heavy bombers in daylight. By end of December 54 sites had been attacked and seven were destroyed. The bombing continued – by end of March 9 destroyed and 35 seriously damaged, by May 24 destroyed and 58 seriously damaged.

Following Operation Hydra, a few Crossbow attacks were conducted on the "Heavy Crossbow" bunkers of Watten (V-2) and Mimoyecques (V-3) from August and November 1943 respectively. "Crossbow Operations Against Ski Sites" began on December 5 with the "Noball" code name used for the targets (e.g., 'Noball 27' was the  site, "Noball No. 93" was in the Cherbourg area, "Noball No. 107" was at Grand Parc, and "Noball V1 site No.147" was at Ligescourt).

The US formed its own Crossbow Committee under General Stephen Henry (New Developments Division) on December 29, 1943, and the US subsequently developed bombing techniques for ski sites in February/March 1944 at the Air Corps Proving Ground.

A mid-1944 plan for US Marine Corps aircraft to attack V-1 launch sites from aircraft carriers fell victim to inter-service rivalry – being opposed by the Army.
V-2 facilities were also bombed in 1944, including smaller facilities such as V-2 storage depots and liquid oxygen plants, such as the Mery-sur-Oise V-2 storage depot on August 4, 1944, and, by the Eighth Air Force, which bombed five cryogenic liquid oxygen plants in Belgium on August 25, 1944, but aborted the next days attack on plants "at La Louviere, Torte and Willebroeck, Belgium" due to cloud.

Priority 

At the request of the British War Cabinet, on April 19, 1944, General Eisenhower directed Crossbow attacks to have absolute priority over all other air operations, including "wearing down German industry" and civilian morale "for the time being", which he confirmed after the V-1 assault began on the night of June 12/13, 1944, saying to Arthur Tedder "with respect to Crossbow targets, these targets are to take first priority over everything except the urgent requirements of the Overlord [invasion of Normandy] battle; this priority to obtain until we can be certain that we have definitely gotten the upper hand of this particular business".

The launches surprised the Allies, who had believed that the earlier attacks on the sites had eliminated the danger. The British, who had not expected German bombing of Britain to resume so late in the war, were especially upset. Some suggested using gas on the launch sites, or even executing German civilians as punishment.

Carl Spaatz, commander of U.S. Strategic Air Forces in Europe (USSTAF), responded on June 28 to "complain that Crossbow was a 'diversion' from the main task of wearing down the Luftwaffe and bombing German industry" for the Combined Bomber Offensive, and to recommend instead that Crossbow be a secondary priority since "days of bad weather over Germany's industrial targets would still allow enough weight of attack for the rocket sites and the lesser tactical crises." By July 10, Tedder had published a list of Crossbow targets which assigned 30 to RAF Bomber Command, six to the tactical  Allied Expeditionary Air Force, and 68 to Spaatz's USSTAF; after which Spaatz again complained, so Eisenhower allowed "spare" bombing of non-Crossbow targets: "Instructions for continuing to make Crossbow targets our first priority must stand, but ... when ... the entire strategic forces cannot be used against Crossbow, we should attack—(a) Aircraft industry, (b) Oil, (c) ball bearing (German): Kugellagerwerke, (d) Vehicular production" (Eisenhower, July 18).

Over a quarter of the Combined Bomber Offensive's tonnage of bombs were used against V-weapon sites in July and August; many of the attacks were ineffective, as they were against unused sites rather than the launchers themselves. Spaatz unsuccessfully proposed that attacks concentrate on the Calais electrical grid, and on gyrocompass factories in Germany and V-weapon storage depots in France. The gyrocompass attacks, along with targeting liquid oxygen tanks (which the Allies knew the V-2 needed), might have been very effective against the missiles. On August 25, 1944, the Joint Crossbow Target Priorities Committee (established July 21) prepared the "Plan for Attack on the German Rocket Organization When Rocket Attacks Commence"—in addition to bombing of storage, liquid-oxygen, and launch sites; the plan included aerial reconnaissance operations.
Following the last V-1 launch from France on September 1, 1944, and since the expected V-2 attacks had not begun, Crossbow bombing was suspended on September 3 and the campaign against German oil facilities became the highest priority.

The V-1 threat from occupied France ended on September 5, 1944, when the 3rd Canadian Infantry Division contained the German military units of the Nord-Pas de Calais area, with their surrender following on September 30.

Resumption 
Crossbow bombing resumed after the first V-2 attack and included a large September 17 raid on Dutch targets suspected as bases for Heinkel He 111s, which were air-launching V-1s. Modified V-1s (865 total) were air-launched from September 16, 1944, to January 14, 1945. The British had initially considered that an earlier July 18–21, 1944 effort of 50 air-launched V-1s had been ground-launched from the Low Countries, particularly near Ostend. In addition to air-launched V-1s, launches were from ramps built in the province of South Holland, the Netherlands in 1945.

Allied reconnaissance detected two sites at Vlaardingen and Ypenburg, and along with a third at Delft, they launched 274 V-1s at London from March 3–29. Only 125 reached the British defences, and only thirteen of those reached the target area. Three additional sites directed their fire on Antwerp. After using medium bombers against V-2 launch site in the Haagse Bos on March 3, the RAF attacked the Holland V-1 sites with two squadrons. An RAF Fighter Command unit used Spitfires against Ypenburg on March 20 and 23, while a RAF Second Tactical Air Force unit used Hawker Typhoons against Vlaardingen on March 23. Counterattacks on Holland's V-1 and V-2 sites ended on April 3, and all Crossbow countermeasures ended on May 2 with the end of World War II in Europe.

V-1 defence 

On January 2, 1944, Air Marshal Roderic Hill, Air Officer Commander-in-Chief of Air Defence of Great Britain submitted his plan to deploy 1,332 guns for the defence of London, Bristol and the Solent against the V-1 "Robot Blitz" (the "Diver Operations Room" was located at RAF Biggin Hill). Against V-1s attacks there were belts of select units of Fighter Command (No. 150 Wing RAF) operating high-speed fighters, the anti-aircraft guns of Anti-Aircraft Command, and approximately 1,750 barrage balloons of Balloon Command around London.

"Flabby" was the code name for medium weather-conditions when fighters were allowed to chase flying bombs over the gun-belt to the balloon line, and during Operation Totter, the Royal Observer Corps fired "Snowflake" illuminating rocket flares from the ground to identify V-1 flying bombs to RAF fighters. After the  Robot Blitz began on the night of June 12/13, 1944, the first RAF fighter interception of a V-1 was on June 14/15. Moreover, anti-aircraft guns increased the rate of downed V-1s to 1 per 77 rounds fired after the introduction of proximity fuses.
Despite the defences, by June 27, "over 100,000 houses had been damaged or destroyed by the V-1 ... and shattered sewage systems threatened serious epidemics unless fixed by winter."

Of the 638 air-launched V-1s that had been observed, guns and fighters brought down 403;  66  fell in the London Civil Defence Region and 169 in other places, including Southampton on July 7 and one as far north as Manchester.

V-2 counter-measures 

The British intelligence services (Secret Intelligence Service and Air Ministry's Scientific Intelligence Office) were monitoring German rocket artillery research and information received by bugging high-ranking German prisoners-of-war increased focus on activities at Peenemunde.
In response to discussions by the  vice-chiefs of staff on the subject of German long range rocket developments, in April 1943 Duncan Sandys was given the responsibility of investigating how far Germany had progressed. Under the codename Bodyline, investigations by SIS, the Combined Services Detailed Interrogation Centre, and the Photographic Reconnaissance Unit were able to confirm existence of rocketry activities at Peenemunde and Sandys reported his findings to the chiefs of staff that the Germans were developing rockets, were probably well-advanced and countermeasures should be studied

The Bodyline Scientific Committee (19 members, including Duncan Sandys, Edward Victor Appleton, John Cockcroft, Robert Watson-Watt) was formed in September 1943 regarding the suspected V-2 rocket. After the 1944 crash of a test V-2 in Sweden, "transmitters to jam the guidance system of the rocket" were prepared. A British sound-ranging system provided "trajectory [data] from which the general launching area could be determined", and the microphone(s) in East Kent reported the times of the first V-2 strikes on September 8, 1944: 18:40:52 and 18:41:08.

In November 1943, the Bodyline committee handed over the tasks to the Air Ministry as the extent of the issue became clear.

On March 21, 1945, the Pile's plan for the "Engagement of Long Range Rockets with AA Gunfire" which called for anti-aircraft units to fire into a radar-predicted airspace to intercept the V-2 was ready, but the plan was not used due to the danger of shells falling on Greater London.

Unlike the V-1, which had a speed similar to the fastest available fighter planes, the velocity and trajectory of a V-2 made aircraft interception an impossibility. Happenstance instances of Allied aircraft encountering launched V-2 rockets include: October 29, 1944, Lieutenants Donald A. Schultz and Charles M. Crane in a Lockheed P-38 Lightning attempted to photograph a launched V-2 above the trees near the River Rhine, January 1, 1945, a 4th Fighter Group pilot aloft over the northern flightpath for attacking elements of five German fighter wings on Unternehmen Bodenplatte that day, observed a V-2 "act up for firing near Lochem ... the rocket was immediately tilted from 85 deg. to 30 deg", and on February 14, 1945, a No. 602 Squadron RAF Spitfire Mk XVI pilot, Raymond Baxter's colleague "Cupid" Love, fired at a V-2 just after launch.

After the last combat V-2 launch on March 27, 1945, the British discontinued their use of radar in the defence region to detect V-2 launches on April 13.

Named activities 
 Bodyline Joint Staff Committee
 Diver – a secret British Defence Instruction specified the code name: "Enemy Flying Bombs will be referred to or known as 'Diver' aircraft or pilotless planes" to alert defences of an imminent attack (often called Operation Diver, particularly post-war, without citation).
 Flying Bomb Counter Measures Committee (Duncan Sandys, chairman)
 Fuel Panel of the Special Scientific Committee (Sir Frank Smith, chairman)
 Questionnaire ... to establish the practicability ... of the German Long-Range Rocket (by Frederick Lindemann, 1st Viscount Cherwell)
 Project Danny, a plan to utilize Marine F4U Corsairs of Marine Air Group 51 to strike V-1 sites with Tiny Tim rockets. The operation was ultimately scrapped under the orders of General Marshall as a result of the intense inter-service rivalry that existed at the time.

See also

 Aviation in World War II
List of air operations during the Battle of Europe
 Strategic bombing during World War II

Notes

References

Bibliography

External links 
 
 Chapter 15: Crossbow Phase II US Army Air Forces in WWII, Volume 3, via ibiblio

 
V-weapons
Peenemünde Army Research Center and Airfield
World War II strategic bombing of Germany
World War II strategic bombing conducted by the United Kingdom
World War II strategic bombing conducted by the United States
Battles of World War II involving Canada
Conflicts in 1943
Conflicts in 1944
Conflicts in 1945
Code names